Birgit Schrowange (born Schrowangen; 7 April 1958 in Nehden, North Rhine-Westphalia) is a German television presenter.

Schrowange works as television presenter on German broadcasters. She has presented Extra – Das RTL-Magazin on RTL Television since October 1994. From 1995 to 2004, she presented a lifestyle magazine called Life! – Die Lust zu leben. Since February 1999, she has hosted Life! – Total verrückt with Dirk Penkwitz. From 1998 to 2006, she lived with television presenter Markus Lanz, with whom she has one son (born 2000).

Honours 

2008: Medal of Merit of the Order of Merit of the Federal Republic of Germany for her commitment against child poverty
2014: Emperor Augustus Order of the Trier Carnival Working Group for social engagement

Literature 
Birgit Schrowange: So viel Lust zu leben. von Schröder, Munich 1998, .

References

External links 

 Official website
 
 

German television presenters
German women television presenters
1958 births
Living people
Recipients of the Medal of the Order of Merit of the Federal Republic of Germany
RTL Group people
ZDF people